The 291st Infantry Regiment was a National Army Infantry Regiment first organized for service in World War II as part of the 75th Infantry Division in Europe.  Since then it has served as a training Regiment, training Army Reserve and Army National Guard Soldiers for service in support of the Global War on Terror.

Service history

World War II

The Regiment was ordered into active military service 15 April 1943 and reorganized at Fort Leonard Wood, Missouri. The Regiment participated in the Louisiana Maneuvers in January 1944. The Regiment departed Camp Shanks on 22 October 1944 through the New York Port of Embarkation.  The Regiment fought across France and Germany, entering Germany on 10 March 1945.
In July 1943, the Regiment was organized with 3,256 Officers and enlisted men:
 Headquarters & Headquarters Company- 111
 Service Company- 114
 Anti-Tank Company- 165
 Cannon Company- 118
 Medical Detachment- 135
 Infantry Battalion (x3)- 871
 Headquarters & Headquarters Company- 126
 Rifle Company (x3)- 193
 Weapons Company- 156

Returning Home

The Regiment departed France and arrived at Camp Patrick Henry and the Hampton Roads Port of Embarkation on 23 November 1945, and inactivated on the same date.

Post War Service

From 1 March 1952, until 15 April 1997, the Regiment served as a training unit under the 95th Training Division working with other units of the Army Reserve.

Current Assignment
 The 1st Battalion is a Regular Army unit assigned to the 181st Infantry Brigade at Fort McCoy, Wisconsin with a mission to train Brigade Support Battalions.
The 2nd Battalion is a Regular Army unit assigned to the 166th Aviation Brigade at Fort Hood, Texas with a mission to train Aviation Battalions.

Campaign streamers

Decorations

Shoulder sleeve insignia
* Description: On a background equally divided horizontally white and red, 3¼ inches high and 2½ inches wide at the base and 2⅛ inches wide at top, a black block letter "A", 2¾ inches high, 2 inches wide at the base and 1⅝ inches wide at top, all members 7/16 inch wide, all enclosed within a 1/8 inch Army Green border.
 Symbolism:
The red and white of the background are the colors used in flags for Armies.
The letter "A" represents "Army" and is also the first letter of the alphabet suggesting "First Army."
 Background:
A black letter "A" was approved as the authorized insignia by the Commanding General, American Expeditionary Force, on 16 November 1918 and approved by the War Department on 5 May 1922.
The background was added on 17 November 1950.

Distinctive Unit Insignia 

 Description/Blazon A Gold color metal and enamel device 1 5/32 inches (2.94 cm) in height overall consisting of a shield blazoned: Gules, on a bend Or an arrow of the field, in sinister chief the head of a Native American warrior of the second dressed with five feathers in scalp lock Sable fimbriated Yellow. Attached below the shield a Gold scroll inscribed "ALTAHA ABILIA" in Black letters.
 Symbolism The five feathers on the Native American's head represent the five Indian tribes of the State of Oklahoma, the state in which the regiment has traditionally been associated. These tribes are Cherokee, Choctaw, Chickasaw, Creeks, and Seminoles. The red arrow is symbolic of the regiment always pointing forward and underlies the unit's motto of "Always Ready." The red background of the shield reflects valor.
 Background The distinctive unit insignia was approved on 1 October 1999.

Coat of arms
 Description/Blazon
 Shield: Gules, on a bend Or an arrow of the field, in sinister chief the head of Native American warrior of the second dressed with five feathers in scalp lock Sable fimbriated Yellow.
 Crest: That for regiments and separate battalions of the Army Reserve: From a wreath Or and Gules, the Lexington Minute Man Proper. The statue of the Minute Man, Captain John Parker (H.H. Kitson, sculptor), stands on the common in Lexington, Massachusetts.
 Motto: ALTAHA ABILIA (Always Ready).
 Shield: The five feathers on the Native American's head represent the five Indian tribes of the State of Oklahoma, the state in which the regiment has traditionally been associated. These tribes are Cherokee, Choctaw, Chickasaw, Creeks and Seminoles. The red arrow is symbolic of the regiment always pointing forward and underlies the unit's motto of "Always Ready." The red background of the shield reflects valor.
 Crest: The crest is that of the U.S. Army Reserve.
 Background: The coat of arms was approved on 1 October 1999

References

Military units and formations established in 1943
291
291
291